The RTÉ Sports Manager of the Year Award is an award given annually as part of the RTÉ Sports Awards ceremony each December. The award is given to the manager who was considered to have made the most substantive contribution to Irish sport in that year. The award is decided by RTÉ Sport department editorial staff.

The award was introduced in 2011 in recognition of the huge effort made behind the scenes and on the sidelines. The first recipient of the award was association football manager Giovanni Trapattoni. The award has been presented to people representing a wide range of sports. The most recent award was presented in 2018 to Graham Shaw.

Winners

By year

By nationality 
This table lists the total number of awards won by managers of each nationality based on the principle of jus soli.

By sport 
This table lists the total number of awards won by managers' sporting profession.

References

RTÉ Sport
Awards established in 2011
Irish sports trophies and awards
Coaching awards